The men's 200 metres at the 2006 European Athletics Championships were held at the Ullevi on August 9 and August 10.
Obikwelu completed the sprinters' double, leading comfortably out of the last curve and continuing all the way to the finish. Wissman took silver in a time level with the national record. Devonish faded in the end and just managed to hold on to third in front of Belgian Kristof Beyens..

Medalists

Schedule

Results

Round 1
Qualification: First 4 in each heat (Q) and the next 8 fastest (q) advance to the Round 2.

Round 2
Qualification: First 4 in each heat (Q)  advance to the semifinals.

Semifinals
First 4 of each Semifinal will be directly qualified (Q) for the Final.

Semifinal 1

Semifinal 2

Final

External links
Results

Events at the 2006 European Athletics Championships
200 metres at the European Athletics Championships